Wyatt "Sonny" Boswell (May 19, 1919 – October 19, 1964) was an early African American professional basketball player. He was born in Greenville, Mississippi and grew up in Toledo, Ohio, where he attended Scott High School. He played for the Harlem Globetrotters from 1939 to 1941 and again from 1943 to 1944.

Boswell was known for taking long distance trick shots to entertain the fans. Abe Saperstein, the manager of the Globetrotters, described Boswell as "one of the great long shot artists of his day". In 1940, Boswell was named MVP of the World Professional Basketball Tournament after scoring eleven points in the Globetrotters' 31–29 championship win over the Chicago Bruins.

During the 1942–43 season, Boswell played for the Chicago Studebaker Flyers of the National Basketball League. He was one of a group of former Harlem Globetrotters who joined the previously all-white NBL to replace players who had recently been drafted for World War II. Over the years, Boswell also appeared in games for the New York Renaissance and the Chicago Monarchs.

After his basketball career, Boswell settled in Chicago, where he managed the Pershing Hotel and later owned his own bowling alley, called Sonny Boswell's South Park Bowl. He died of a heart attack at age 45 in 1964.

References

1919 births
1964 deaths
African-American basketball players
American men's basketball players
Basketball players from Ohio
Chicago Studebaker Flyers players
Guards (basketball)
Harlem Globetrotters players
New York Renaissance players
Sportspeople from Greenville, Mississippi
Sportspeople from Toledo, Ohio
20th-century African-American sportspeople